Horatio William Walpole, 4th Earl of Orford (18 April 1813 – 7 December 1894), styled Lord Walpole between 1822 and 1858, was a British peer and Conservative politician.

Background
Orford was the son of Horatio Walpole, 3rd Earl of Orford, and Mary, daughter of William Augustus Fawkener.

Political career
In 1835, at the age of 21, Orford was returned to Parliament as one of two representatives for Norfolk East, a seat he held until 1837. In 1858 he succeeded his father in the earldom and took his seat in the House of Lords. He referred to the famed advocate of women's rights Mary Wollstonecraft as "a hyena in petticoats".

Family
Lord Orford married Harriet Bettina Frances, daughter of Admiral the Hon. Sir Fleetwood Pellew, in 1841. He "treated her with grotesquely violent cruelty" and in 1846 she went to live in Florence. They had two daughters. 
 Lady Dorothy Elizabeth Mary Walpole (1842-1921), married Don Ernesto del Balzo, 7. Duca di Caprigliano, Duca del Balzo 
 Lady Maude Mary Walpole  (b.9 Aug 1844), married Count Salvatore Grifeo and Grevana, Prince Palagonia

She died in November 1886. Lord Orford survived her by eight years and died in December 1894, aged 81. He was succeeded in the earldom by his nephew, Robert.

Lord Orford had an illegitimate child, Horatio Walpole, by the Lady Susan, wife of the 5th Duke of Newcastle and daughter of Alexander Douglas-Hamilton, 10th Duke of Hamilton.

References

External links
 

1813 births
1894 deaths
Earls in the Peerage of the United Kingdom
Members of the Parliament of the United Kingdom for English constituencies
UK MPs 1835–1837
UK MPs who inherited peerages
Horatio
Earls of Orford
Conservative Party (UK) hereditary peers